The 1848–49 United States House of Representatives elections were held on various dates in various states between August 1848 and November 1849. Each state set its own date for its elections to the House of Representatives before the first session of the 31st United States Congress convened on December 3, 1849. The new state of Wisconsin elected its first representatives, and California also held its first congressional elections before officially achieving statehood in 1850, increasing the size of the House to 233 seats.

These elections spanned the 1848 United States presidential election and took place amid the U.S. victory over Mexico in the (1846–48) Mexican–American War. The Whigs lost their House majority as Democrats, whose support had driven the war, gained a House plurality. Among minor parties, the Free Soil Party won nine Northern seats, while the American or "Know Nothing" Party retained one.

Following the discovery of gold in January 1848, California boomed, creating immediate pressure for statehood.  The Compromise of 1850, though largely crafted in the Senate, was also passed by the House, brokering its admission to the Union.  Anticipating statehood, California elected two members at-large on November 11, 1849, to be seated September 11, 1850.

As neither major party held a majority when Congress convened on December 3, 1849 ⁠— the Democrats finished three seats short, while the Whigs had lost 12 seats and the majority ⁠— the election of a Speaker proved contentious.

The Whigs were sectionally split, with Northern Whigs nominating incumbent speaker Robert C. Winthrop of Massachusetts and Southern Whigs supporting Meredith P. Gentry of Tennessee. Democrats primarily supported Howell Cobb of Georgia; 13 other Democratic hopefuls also garnered support. The small Free Soil Party, opposing expansion of slavery into the Western territories, supported David Wilmot of Pennsylvania, author of the Wilmot Proviso, calling attention to slave power's hold over both major parties.

After nearly three weeks of heated debate, the House suspended its majority rule for the Speaker election: Cobb was elected on the 63rd ballot by plurality.

Election summaries
Wisconsin was apportioned an additional seat in 1848, and two more seats were added for the new state of California.

Special elections

30th Congress 

|-
! 
| John W. Hornbeck
|  | Whig
| 1846
|  | Incumbent died January 16, 1848.New member elected March 6, 1848.Democratic gain.Successor was not a candidate for the next term, see below.
| nowrap | 

|-
! 
| John Quincy Adams
|  | Whig
| 1830
|  | Incumbent died February 23, 1848.New member elected April 3, 1848.Whig hold.Successor later re-elected for the next term, see below.
| nowrap | 

|-
! 
| James A. Black
|  | Democratic
| 1843
|  | Incumbent died April 3, 1848.New member elected October 10, 1848.Democratic hold.Successor later re-elected for the next term, see below.
| nowrap | 

|-
! 
| John M. Holley
|  | Whig
| 1846
|  | Incumbent died March 8, 1848.New member elected November 7, 1848.Whig hold.Successor later re-elected for the next term, see below.
| nowrap | 

|-
! 
| Alexander D. Sims
|  | Democratic
| 1844
|  | Incumbent died November 22, 1848.New member elected January 9, 1849.Democratic hold.Successor later elected for the next term, see below.
| nowrap | 

|-
! 
| 
| 
| 
| New delegate elected October 30, 1848.

|}

31st Congress 

|-
! 
| Alexander D. Sims
|  | Democratic
| 1844
|  | Incumbent had been re-elected, see below, but died November 22, 1848.New member elected January 16, 1849.Democratic.Successor having already been elected to finish the current term, see above.
| nowrap | 

|-
! 
| Rodolphus Dickinson
|  | Democratic
| 
| Incumbent died March 20, 1849.New member elected in 1849.

|-
! 
| 
| 
|
|-
! 
| 
| 
|
|}

Alabama 

Elections were held August 6, 1849, after the March 4, 1849 beginning of the term, but before the House first convened in December 1849.

|-
! 

|-
! 

|-
! 

|-
! 

|-
! 

|-
! 

|-
! 

|}

Arkansas 

The election was held August 7, 1848.

|-
! 

|}

California 

California two at-large members were elected November 11, 1849 in anticipation of statehood and seated September 11, 1850.

|-
! rowspan=2 | 
| colspan=3 | None
|  | New seat.New member elected.Independent gain.
| rowspan=2 nowrap | 

|-
| colspan=3 | None
|  | New seat.New member elected.Democratic gain.

|}

Connecticut 

Elections were held April 2, 1849, after the March 4, 1849 beginning of the term, but before the House first convened in December 1849.

|-
! 

|-
! 

|-
! 

|-
! 

|}

Delaware 

The election was held November 6, 1848.

|-
! 

|}

Florida 

Florida's single at-large member was elected October 2, 1848.

|-
! 
| Edward C. Cabell
|  | Whig
| 1846
| Incumbent re-elected.
| nowrap | 

|}

Georgia 

Elections were held October 2, 1848.

|-
! 

|-
! 

|-
! 

|-
! 

|-
! 

|-
! 

|-
! 

|-
! 

|}

Illinois 

Elections were held August 7, 1848.

|-
! 

|-
! 

|-
! 

|-
! 

|-
! 

|-
! 

|-
! 

|}

Indiana 

Elections were held August 10, 1849, after the March 4, 1849 beginning of the term, but before the House first convened in December 1849.

|-
! 

|-
! 

|-
! 

|-
! 

|-
! 

|-
! 

|-
! 

|-
! 

|-
! 

|-
! 

|}

Iowa 

Elections were held August 7, 1848.

|-
! 

|-
! 

|}

Kentucky 

Elections were held August 6, 1849, after the March 4, 1849 beginning of the term, but before the House first convened in December 1849.

|-
! 

|-
! 

|-
! 

|-
! 

|-
! 

|-
! 

|-
! 

|-
! 

|-
! 

|-
! 

|}

Louisiana 

Elections were held November 5, 1849, after the March 4, 1849 beginning of the term, but before the House first convened in December 1849.

|-
! 

|-
! 

|-
! 

|-
! 

|}

Maine 

Elections were held September 11, 1848.

|-
! 

|-
! 

|-
! 

|-
! 

|-
! 

|-
! 

|-
! 

|}

Maryland 

Elections were held October 3, 1849 elections were after the March 4, 1849 beginning of the new term, but still before the Congress convened in December 1849.

|-
! 

|-
! 

|-
! 

|-
! 

|-
! 

|-
! 

|}

Massachusetts 

Elections were held November 13, 1848.

|-
! 

|-
! 

|-
! 

|-
! 
| John G. Palfrey
|  | Whig
| 1846
|  | Incumbent lost re-election as Free Soil candidate.No member elected due to failure to achieve majority vote.Whig loss.
| nowrap | 

|-
! 

|-
! 

|-
! 
| Julius Rockwell
|  | Whig
| 1844 
| Incumbent re-elected.
| nowrap | 

|-
! 

|-
! 

|-
! 

|}

Michigan 

Elections were held November 7, 1848.

|-
! 
| Robert McClelland
| 
| 1843
|  | Incumbent retired.New member elected.Democratic hold.
| nowrap | 

|-
! 
| Charles E. Stuart
| 
| 1847 
|  | Incumbent lost re-election.New member elected.Whig gain.
| nowrap | 

|-
! 
| Kinsley S. Bingham
| 
| 1846
| Incumbent re-elected.
| nowrap | 

|}

Minnesota Territory 
See Non-voting delegates, below.

Mississippi 

Elections were held November 5–6, 1849, after the March 4, 1849 beginning of the term, but before the House first convened in December 1849.

|-
! 
| Jacob Thompson
|  | Democratic
| 1839
| Incumbent re-elected.
| nowrap | 

|-
! 
| Winfield S. Featherston
|  | Democratic
| 1847
| Incumbent re-elected.
| nowrap | 

|-
! 
| Patrick W. Tompkins
|  | Whig
| 1847
|  | Incumbent retired.New member elected.Democratic gain.
| nowrap | 

|-
! 
| Albert G. Brown
|  | Democratic
| 1847
| Incumbent re-elected.
| nowrap | 

|}

Missouri 

Elections were held August 7, 1848.

|-
! 

|-
! 

|-
! 

|-
! 

|-
! 

|}

New Hampshire 

Elections were held March 13, 1849, after the March 4, 1849 beginning of the term, but before the House first convened in December 1849.

|-
! 

|-
! 

|-
! 

|-
! 

|}

New Jersey 

Elections were held November 7, 1848.

|-
! 

|-
! 

|-
! 

|-
! 

|-
! 

|}

New York 

Elections were held November 7, 1848.

|-
! 

|-
! 

|-
! 

|-
! 

|-
! 

|-
! 

|-
! 

|-
! 

|-
! 

|-
! 

|-
! 

|-
! 

|-
! 

|-
! 

|-
! 

|-
! 

|-
! 

|-
! 

|-
! 

|-
! 

|-
! 

|-
! 

|-
! 

|-
! 

|-
! 

|-
! 

|-
! 

|-
! 

|-
! 

|-
! 

|-
! 

|-
! 

|-
! 

|-
! 

|}

North Carolina 

Elections were held August 7, 1849, after the March 4, 1849 beginning of the term, but before the House first convened in December 1849.

|-
! 

|-
! 

|-
! 

|-
! 

|-
! 

|-
! 

|-
! 

|-
! 

|-
! 

|}

Ohio 

Elections were held October 10, 1848.

|-
! 

|-
! 

|-
! 

|-
! 

|-
! 

|-
! 

|-
! 

|-
! 

|-
! 

|-
! 

|-
! 

|-
! 

|-
! 

|-
! 

|-
! 

|-
! 

|-
! 

|-
! 

|-
! 

|-
! 

|-
! 

|}

Oregon Territory 
See Non-voting delegates, below.

Pennsylvania 

Elections were held October 10, 1848.

|-
! 

|-
! 

|-
! 

|-
! 

|-
! 

|-
! 

|-
! 

|-
! 

|-
! 

|-
! 

|-
! 

|-
! 

|-
! 

|-
! 

|-
! 

|-
! 

|-
! 

|-
! 

|-
! 

|-
! 

|-
! 

|-
! 

|-
! 

|-
! 

|}

Rhode Island 

Elections were held April 4, 1849, after the March 4, 1849 beginning of the term, but before the House first convened in December 1849.

|-
! 

|-
! 

|}

South Carolina 

Elections were held October 9–10, 1848.

|-
! 

|-
! 

|-
! 

|-
! 
| Alexander D. Sims
|  | Democratic
| 1844
| Incumbent re-elected.Incumbent then died November 22, 1848, leading to  two special elections.
| nowrap | 

|-
! 

|-
! 

|-
! 

|}

Tennessee 

Elections were held August 2, 1849.

|-
! 
| Andrew Johnson
|  | Democratic
| 1842
| Incumbent re-elected.
| nowrap | 

|-
! 
| William M. Cocke
|  | Whig
| 1845
|  |Incumbent lost re-election as a Democrat.New member elected.Whig hold.
| nowrap | 

|-
! 
| John H. Crozier
|  | Whig
| 1845
|  |Incumbent retired.New member elected.Whig hold.
| nowrap | 

|-
! 
| Hugh L.W. Hill
|  | Democratic
| 1847
|  |Incumbent retired.New member elected.Democratic hold.
| nowrap | 

|-
! 
| George W. Jones
|  | Democratic
| 1842
| Incumbent re-elected.
| nowrap | 

|-
! 
| James H. Thomas
|  | Democratic
| 1847
| Incumbent re-elected.
| nowrap | 

|-
! 
| Meredith P. Gentry
|  | Whig
| 1845
| Incumbent re-elected.
| nowrap | 

|-
! 
| Washington Barrow
|  | Whig
| 1847
|  |Incumbent retired.New member elected.Democratic gain.
| nowrap | 

|-
! 
| Lucien B. Chase
|  | Democratic
| 1845
|  |Incumbent retired.New member elected.Democratic hold.
| nowrap | 

|-
! 
| Frederick P. Stanton
|  | Democratic
| 1845
| Incumbent re-elected.
| nowrap | 

|-
! 
| William T. Haskell
|  | Whig
| 1847 
|  |Incumbent retired.New member elected.Whig hold.
| nowrap | 

|}

Texas 

Elections were held August 6, 1849.

|-
! 

|-
! 

|}

Vermont 

Elections were held September 5, 1848.

|-
! 

|-
! 

|-
! 

|-
! 

|}

Virginia 

Elections were held April 26, 1849, after the March 4, 1849 beginning of the term, but before the House first convened in December 1849.

|-
! 

|-
! 

|-
! 

|-
! 

|-
! 

|-
! 

|-
! 

|-
! 

|-
! 

|-
! 

|-
! 

|-
! 

|-
! 

|-
! 

|-
! 

|}

Wisconsin 

Wisconsin members were first elected in advance of its June 1848 statehood.  It elected two members to finish the current term in the 30th Congress, and then it gained an elected an additional member for elections to the 31st Congress.

30th Congress 
Wisconsin's two members were elected May 8, 1848.

|-
! 
| colspan=3 | New seat
|  | New seat.New member elected May 8, 1848.Democratic gain.
|  nowrap | 

|-
! 
| colspan=3 | New seat
|  | New seat.New member elected May 8, 1848.Democratic gain.
|  nowrap | 

|}

31st Congress 
Wisconsin's three members were elected November 7, 1848.

|-
! 
| William Pitt Lynde
|  | Democratic
| 1848
|  | Incumbent lost re-election.New member elected.Free Soil gain.
|  nowrap | 

|-
! 
| Mason C. Darling
|  | Democratic
| 1848
|  | Incumbent retired.New member elected.Whig gain.
|  nowrap | 

|-
! 
| colspan=3 | New seat
|  | New seat.New member elected.Democratic gain.
|  nowrap | 
|}

Non-voting delegates 

Going into these elections, there were no incumbent delegates, because the only territory — Wisconsin Territory — became a state in 1848. Two new territories — Minnesota Territory and Oregon Territory — were granted delegates in 1849.

|-
! 
| colspan=3 | New district
|  | New seat.New delegate elected July 7, 1849.Democratic gain.
| nowrap | 

|-
! 
| colspan=3 | New district
|  | New seat.New delegate elected in 1849.Democratic gain.
| nowrap | 

|}

See also
 1848 United States elections
 List of United States House of Representatives elections (1824–1854)
 1848 United States presidential election
 1848–49 United States Senate elections
 30th United States Congress
 31st United States Congress

Notes

References

Bibliography

External links
 Office of the Historian (Office of Art & Archives, Office of the Clerk, U.S. House of Representatives)